Boies Schiller Flexner LLP is a national law firm based in New York City. The firm was founded by David Boies and Jonathan D. Schiller, in 1997, who, in 1999, were joined by Donald L. Flexner, former partner with Crowell & Moring, then forming Boies, Schiller & Flexner.

The firm has become known for its involvement in high-profile litigation, having represented the Department of Justice in the antitrust action United States v. Microsoft, as well as Vice President Gore in the Supreme Court case Bush v. Gore. More recently, Boies successfully challenged the constitutionality of California's Proposition 8 in Perry v. Brown, and represented the National Football League in the antitrust litigation initiated by the players' union. The firm has drawn controversy for its aggressive tactics during representation of Harvey Weinstein amidst sexual abuse allegations and the now-defunct blood testing startup Theranos.

Notable clients
Among other high-profile clients, Boies Schiller has long represented film producer Harvey Weinstein, against whom sexual abuse allegations were levied in October 2017. The New Yorker reported in November 2017 that Boies Schiller had, on Weinstein's behalf, directed private intelligence companies, including Black Cube, to spy on and orchestrate smear campaigns against alleged victims of Weinstein's and on reporters who were investigating Weinstein's actions. The New York Times, which was at the same time a target of the reported espionage and a client of Boies Schiller's, considered this "intolerable conduct". The New York Times announced a few days later it had "terminated its relationship" with Boies' firm.

Boies Schiller, and specifically David Boies himself, notably represented Theranos for several years, including against the fraud claims that toppled the blood-testing company. In Bad Blood: Secrets and Lies in a Silicon Valley Startup by The Wall Street Journal investigative reporter John Carreyrou, the firm is described as protecting the startup using surveillance of witnesses and journalists, weaponized use of non-disclosure agreements and affidavits, intimidation tactics, and other heavy-handed practices. Boies Schiller is portrayed by Carreyrou as acting as an extension of Theranos, including the use of the law firm's New York offices for hosting promotional meetings such as a faked blood test administered to Fortune writer Roger Parloff. According to Carreyrou, the firm agreed to be paid in Theranos stock, and Boies himself served on the Theranos board of directors, raising questions about conflicts of interest. Boies Schiller ended its representation of Theranos in November 2016 due to disagreements about legal strategy. Former Theranos general counsel Heather King was hired back by Boies Schiller after having served as the general counsel at Theranos. King had previously been a lawyer at Boies Schiller during its representation of Theranos, and she, David Boies, and lawyer Michael Brille featured prominently in Bad Blood.

The firm also represents Amazon in corporate matters, and Amazon founder and CEO Jeff Bezos personally retained attorneys from Boies Schiller as part of his crisis-management team in the wake of Bezos's claims of extortion by AMI.

Political contributions 
According to OpenSecrets, Boies Schiller was one of the law firms with the most employee contributions to federal candidates during the 2012 election cycle, donating $1.92 million, 90% to Democrats. Since 2000, Boies Schiller employees have contributed almost $8.2 million to federal campaigns.

Notable lawyers and alumni

 David Boies, chairman of the firm, is a former partner.
Jonathan Schiller, managing partner of the firm, was the Chairman of the Board of Trustees of Columbia University from 2013 to 2018.
 Kirsten Gillibrand, U.S. Senator from New York, is a former partner.
 Tanya S. Chutkan, a United States District Judge for the District of Columbia, is a former partner of the firm's Washington, D.C. office.
 Susan Estrich, a partner, was the first female president of the Harvard Law Review.
 Hampton Dellinger, a partner, was formerly North Carolina's Deputy Attorney General.
 Ann O'Leary, the chief of staff to California Governor Gavin Newsom and former co-executive director of the Clinton-Kaine Transition Team, is a former partner.
 Stephen N. Zack, a partner, was president of the American Bar Association from 2010 to 2011.
 Elizabeth Wurtzel, a writer and journalist, is a former associate.
 Hunter Biden, son of President Joe Biden, is a former counsel.

See also
 SCO–Linux disputes
 Dalvik (software)

References

Law firms established in 1997
Law firms based in New York (state)